Ross Elementary School can refer to:
Ross Elementary School (Abbotsford, British Columbia)
Ross Elementary School (Braintree, Massachusetts)
Ross Elementary School (Houston, Texas)
Ross Elementary School (Washington, D.C.)
Ernest L. Ross Elementary School, Cleveland, Tennessee